Olomu is a Kingdom in Delta State, Nigeria. Olomu is one of the oldest kingdoms in Urhobo ethnic nationality of the Niger Delta region.

The paramount ruler of Olomu is known as Ohworode (King) R' Olomu. The current king is His Royal Majesty Ovie Richard Layeguen Ogbon, Ogoni-Oghoro

The kingdom has over 15 towns, including 
Agbon
Akperhe
Aloba
Ogoni
Okpe
Ophori
Okpavorhe
Oguname 
Okpari
Ovwoorhokpokpo
Oviri-Olomu
Ovwor
Ovworigbala
Ofuomanefe
Umuolo

References

External links

Populated places in Delta State
Former countries in Africa